The Spanish air traffic controllers crisis began on December 3, 2010 when the Socialist Government of José Luis Rodríguez Zapatero declared rate 0 forcing a National Air Navigation Lock-Out  and portraying air traffic controllers in Spanish airports (and in other units) as if they were walking out in a coordinated wildcat strike. Following that lock-out, the Spanish Government authorised the Spanish military forces to escort air traffic controllers in order to continue operations in a total of eight airports, including the country's two main airports, Madrid-Barajas and Barcelona-El Prat.
On the morning of December 4, the government declared a 'State of Alert', conscripting the controllers back to work supervised by the military forces and under the military law, instead of the civil law.

The move by the Spanish Government came after a year of dispute with the air traffic controllers and the Spanish airport authority Aena over working conditions, work schedules and benefits. According to some sources, air traffic controllers could earn up to 350,000 euros per annum, a claim that has been hotly disputed. This meant that the controllers did not receive much sympathy in Spain. On the same day as the lock-out, the Spanish Council of Ministers approved plans to partially privatise Aena.

The use of emergency powers was the first time since the restoration of democracy in 1975 that a state of alert had been called. Under the measure, controllers were escorted by armed guards and faced arrest for the crime of disobedience, stipulated in the Spanish military penal code in case of not showing up at work. Some controllers reported to have been forced to work at gunpoint.

The use of this measure by the Spanish government has been severely criticised by ATCEUC (Air Traffic Controllers European Unions Coordination) through a press release. And also by judge Juan Antonio Vázquez Taín:

See also 
 Professional Air Traffic Controllers Organization (1968)

References 

2010 in Spain
Politics of Spain
2010 labor disputes and strikes
Aviation strikes
Labour disputes in Spain
Air traffic control in Europe